Haemangela is a genus of moths of the  family Heliodinidae. It contains only one species, Haemangela vindicatrix, which is found on the Solomon Islands.

References

Heliodinidae